The Albatros W.8 was a German biplane fighter  floatplane that saw service during First World War. It patrolled the seas around 1918. The fuselage of the aircraft was made of wood, similar to most aircraft designs of that period. The W.8 had a water-cooled Benz IIIb eight-cylinder engine fitted with a fixed two-bladed wooden propeller.

Specifications (W.8)

References

Bibliography

External links

Albatros W.8

W.8
1910s German fighter aircraft
Floatplanes
Biplanes
Single-engined tractor aircraft
Aircraft first flown in 1918